Agrippine is a French animated series, adapted from the comic strip by Claire Bretécher it was debuted on 12  November 2001 on Canal +. Bretécher was not involved in the project, and was not impressed with the results.

Synopsis 
This series is an adaptation of the comic book series Agrippine created by Claire Bretécher in 1988.

It features Agrippine, a sixteen-year-old girl raised by hippy parents. Agrippine is a sarcastic and rebellious young girl with her anxieties, her problems and her joys.

Cast 
 Julia Vaidis-Bogard : Agrippine
 Frédérique Tirmont : Poule
 Jean-Gabriel Nordmann : Merlan
 Bilal Chennoune : Biron
 Nadia Barentin : Ninifle
 Axelle Charvoz : Bergère
 François Comar : Modern
 Benjamin van Meggelen : Morose le Hachis

Episode list

References

2001 French television series debuts
2002 French television series endings
2000s French animated television series
French children's animated comedy television series
Canal+ original programming
Television series based on French comics